Chun Byung-kwan (Hangul: 전병관; born November 4, 1969 in Jinan, Jeollabuk-do) is an Olympic weightlifter who represented South Korea.

External links 
 Profile at databaseolympics.com

1969 births
Living people
South Korean male weightlifters
Olympic weightlifters of South Korea
Weightlifters at the 1988 Summer Olympics
Weightlifters at the 1992 Summer Olympics
Weightlifters at the 1996 Summer Olympics
Olympic gold medalists for South Korea
Olympic medalists in weightlifting
Asian Games medalists in weightlifting
Weightlifters at the 1990 Asian Games
Weightlifters at the 1994 Asian Games
Korea University alumni
Medalists at the 1992 Summer Olympics
Medalists at the 1988 Summer Olympics
Olympic silver medalists for South Korea
Asian Games gold medalists for South Korea
Medalists at the 1990 Asian Games
Medalists at the 1994 Asian Games
World Weightlifting Championships medalists
20th-century South Korean people
21st-century South Korean people